Agriculture Week is a weekly agricultural and food science research magazine reporting on the latest developments in agriculture and food production. Its main topics are agribusiness, Crops, Livestock and Markets. The magazine is read primarily in the Local North Dakota area. It is published by Vertical News, an imprint of NewsRx, LLC. In 1998 Agriculture Week moved into the online market with their website, which, along with changing the magazine into a blog like format, introduced their weather, crop prediction, and policy news show, known as "Agweektv". As of 2020 the website was being hosted by the Forum Communications Company, or the FCC for short. The TV show and website are watched throughout North America, but the Dakotas, Minnesota, Montana, and the Canadian Shield all have increased views.

References

External links 
 
Official show
Website host
Articles on HighBeam Research.

Agricultural magazines
Food and drink magazines
Magazines published in Atlanta
Magazines with year of establishment missing
Weekly magazines published in the United States